The 1942 International cricket season was from April 1942 to August 1942. There were no any major cricket played during this season due to prevailing Second World War.

See also
 Cricket in World War II

References

1942 in cricket